The 2011 Pittsburgh Panthers football team represented the University of Pittsburgh in the 2011 NCAA Division I FBS football season. The Panthers were led through the regular season by first-year head coach Todd Graham and played eight home games at Heinz Field. Defensive coordinator Keith Patterson was named interim coach for the season-ending bowl game after Graham resigned in favor of a head coaching position at Arizona State.

Previous season
In 2010, the Panthers finished 8–5 overall and 5–2 in the Big East to win a share of the Big East Championship with Connecticut and West Virginia and won the BBVA Compass Bowl against the Kentucky Wildcats. After the December 5 game against Cincinnati, head coach Dave Wannstedt resigned under pressure. On December 16, the University of Pittsburgh hired then Miami (Ohio) head coach Michael Haywood. Just 16 days later, on January 1, Haywood was fired by Pittsburgh after being charged with felony domestic violence. On January 10, Pitt hired Tulsa head coach Todd Graham.

Spring game
Pitt concluded its spring practices under new coach Todd Graham and showcased its new offensive and defensive schemes to the public for the first time in its annual Blue-Gold game on April 16, 2011 at Heinz Field. Despite cold and rainy weather, the offense completed 81 passes and threw for 498 yards. The Blue team, which was composed of first-team players, ran 100 plays in two hours en route to a 48–13 victory over the Gold team which was composed of reserve players. The opening kickoff was returned 87 yard for a touchdown by defensive back Buddy Jackson. Quarterback Tino Sunseri completed 35 of 55 passes for 416 yards and two scores while having one interception and a fumble. Linebacker Carl Fleming had a game-high 12 tackles and two sacks and the defense forced five total turnovers. Kevin Harper completed a 52-yard field goal. The Ed Conway Award, which is give to the most improved players of the spring, went to Buddy Jackson, Anthony Gonzalez, and Tyrone Ezell.

Schedule

Roster

Coaching staff

Following the conclusion of the regular season, coaches Tony Dews, Tony Gibson, and Calvin Magee left to take positions with Rich Rodriguez's staff at Arizona and did not coach in the BBVA Compass Bowl.

Team players drafted into the NFL

Post-season
Less than one year from his hiring, on the evening of December 13, Graham informed  Athletic Director Steve Pederson that he had discussed coaching opportunity at Arizona State. After being informed he did not have permission to talk to the school about the job and refusing conversations with Pederson and another administrator, Graham resigned the next morning to accept the head coaching job at Arizona State University. Graham informed his Pitt players of his departure by having text message forwarded to the team by director of football operations Blair Philbrick. Keith Patterson was named as the interim head coach for the BBVA Compass Bowl.

On December 22, 2011, Wisconsin offensive coordinator Paul Chryst was introduced as the next permanent head coach to take over the Panthers following the BBVA Compass Bowl.

Awards
Sophomore defensive lineman Aaron Donald was named a second team All-American by FoxSportsNext.com.
Ray Graham, despite missing the final four games of the season with an injury, and Jarred Holley received first-team All-Big East recognition. Chas Alecxih, Aaron Donald, Max Gruder, and Antwuan Reed received second team honors.

References

Pittsburgh
Pittsburgh Panthers football seasons
Panthers football